Sibat is a Filipino  spear.

Sibat or SIBAT may also refer to:

Israeli Defense Ministry's International Defense Cooperation Directorate 
 , the company managing the Funiculaire de Thonon-les-Bains, France
Ali Hussain Sibat, Lebanese and talk show host sentenced to death for sorcery in Saudi Arabia
Ibn Sibat (died 1520), Druze chronicler

See also

Sibaté
Sabat
CBAT (disambiguation)